Armando Obispo (born 5 March 1999) is a Dutch professional footballer who plays as a centre back for PSV Eindhoven. He has represented the Netherlands internationally at various youth levels.

Career
Obispo made his professional debut as Jong PSV player in the second division on 8 August 2016 against FC Den Bosch.

Personal life
Obispo was born in the Netherlands and is of Curaçaoan descent.

Career statistics

Club

Honours
PSV Eindhoven
Johan Cruyff Shield: 2021, 2022

References

External links

 Profile at the PSV Eindhoven website
 
 Netherlands U19 profile
 Netherlands U20 profile
 Netherlands U21 profile

1999 births
Living people
People from Boxtel
Association football central defenders
Dutch footballers
Netherlands youth international footballers
Dutch people of Curaçao descent
Eredivisie players
Eerste Divisie players
PSV Eindhoven players
Jong PSV players
SBV Vitesse players
Footballers from North Brabant
Netherlands under-21 international footballers
Sportspeople from 's-Hertogenbosch